Club Baloncesto Ambroz Plasencia, more commonly referred to today by its sponsorship name of Plasencia Extremadura, is a Basketball team based in Plasencia, Extremadura.

History

Plasencia Ambroz was founded in 1978 as a merge of the clubs Centro Juventud and La Salle.

The most important milestone of the club was in 1995, when the club reached the Final Stage of the Liga EBA, and played the promotion playoffs to the top tier, the Liga ACB.

In 2003, Plasencia Ambroz promoted to LEB league, second division, after an expansion of this league to 18 teams. It played in it during three seasons before relegation, outstanding in the first one, when it finished as runner-up of the Copa Príncipe and qualified again to the playoffs for promoting to the ACB League.

Since 2006, the club played in LEB Plata after resigning to its place in 2011, voluntarily to Liga EBA, fourth division, until 2017 when the club came back to the third tier after achieving a vacant berth.

In 2019, after being relegated again to Liga EBA, the senior squad was folded due to the lack of support, maintaining only the youth teams.

Season by season

Trophies and awards

Trophies
Copa Extremadura: (8)
2002, 2003, 2004, 2005, 2006, 2007, 2009, 2010

References

External links
Official website

Basketball teams in Extremadura
Former LEB Oro teams
Liga EBA teams
Former LEB Plata teams
Sport in Plasencia